Who Gets the Dog? is a 2016 American romantic comedy film directed by Huck Botko, from a screenplay by Matt Wheeler and Rick Rapoza. The film stars Alicia Silverstone and Ryan Kwanten as a divorcing couple.

Plot

The film centres on a divorcing couple, Dr Olive Greene (Alicia Silverstone) and Clay Lonergan (Ryan Kwanten), a professional ice hockey player. Both want custody of their beloved dog Wesley.

The dog, a golden Labrador Retriever, is the centre of this couple's universe. When Olive gets tired of Clay's immaturity she throws him out of the matrimonial home. Clay moves to a trailer down by the lake in the woods.

They take Wesley to a dog psychologist, who says the dog needs discipline. Olive goes to a dog trainer, Glenn, who quickly controls Wesley and asks Olive out on a date.

While Clay has Wesley at his trailer he attempts to make a video with the help of his best friend, Rhett, but the video shows how undisciplined the dog is.

After another visit to the pet psychologist, the couple attempt to reconcile, but Glenn drops in unannounced and tells Clay he and Olive are dating.

Clay wants Olive back and tries to woo her at a street festival. Glenn intervenes and gets in a scuffle with Clay and Olive has to separate the two. She is not impressed with Clay's behaviour.

At their final court appearance, the adoption papers are presented and the judge rules in Clay's favour.

Clay gets promoted to the big league but at the same time, his dog wanders off and goes missing. He calls Olive to help search for the dog, who is finally found in a homeless shelter with some hobos.

During Clay's first game he gets injured and gets his best friend to return the dog to Olive. Olive visits Clay in the hospital and they kiss.

They reconcile in the end and decide to stop the divorce proceedings. They later have a baby.

Cast
 Alicia Silverstone as Olive Greene
 Ryan Kwanten as Clay Lonnergan
 Randall Batinkoff as Glenn Hannon 
 Matty Ryan as Rhett
 Rachel Cerda as Libby
 Amy J. Carle as Dr. Wendy
 Devin Bethea as Koji
 Brandy, Maureen, Mavis, Dennis, Ally, Richard, Lollipop, Amara, Ashley, Jana, and Liv as Wesley

Production

The film was shot in Chicago in February 2015. Scenes were shot during a real Chicago Wolves game at the Allstate Arena.

Release
The film was released on DVD, Blu-ray, Digital HD, and VOD platforms on September 13, 2016, by 20th Century Fox Home Entertainment.

References

External links
 

2016 films
2016 direct-to-video films
2016 independent films
2016 romantic comedy films
 American direct-to-video films
 American ice hockey films
 American independent films
 American romantic comedy films
Direct-to-video comedy films
 Films about divorce
 Films about dogs
 Films about pets
 Films set in Chicago
 Films shot in Chicago
 Samuel Goldwyn Films films
20th Century Fox direct-to-video films
2010s English-language films
 Films directed by Huck Botko
2010s American films